Michelle Parker (born April 10, 1987) is a pro-skier from Truckee, California, USA. She started skiing in her home resort Squaw Valley Ski Resort. At the age of 15, she started dedicating herself to freeskiing. She has subsequently competed in the U.S. Freeskiing open, X-games and Red Bull Cold Rush.

Parker is one of the founders of S.A.F.E. A.S. (Skiers Advocating and Fostering Education for Avalanche and Snow Safety). The main goal for S.A.F.E A.S. is to heightening community snow safety and avalanche awareness we have created a women's intro to avalanche safety clinic.

Career achievements

Competition results 
 2013: 3rd place: Red Bull Cold Rush, Silverton, USA
 2011: 3rd Place: Red Bull Cold Rush, Silverton, USA
 2009: 1st Place: Aspen Open, Aspen, USA
 2007: 2nd Place: US Freeskiing Open - Slopestyle, Copper Mountain, USA
 2006: 3rd Place: US Freeskiing Open - Slopestyle, Vail, USA

Awards 
 2013: Best Female Performance, Powder VIdeo Awards
 2013: Best Female Performance, International Freeski Film Festival

Filmography 
 2015: Matchstick Productions - Fade to Winter
 2015: Matchstick Productions - Migrations
 2014:  Matchstick Productions - Days of my Youth
 2014: Red Bull - The Faces of Dav
 2013: Warren Miller - Like There's no Tomorrow
 2013: Matchstick Productions - In Deep
 2013: Matchstick Productions - Claim
 2013: Poor Boyz Productions - Yeah Dude
 2013: Poor Boyz Productions - Ski Porn
 2012: Matchstick Productions - Superheroes of Stoke
 2009: Matchstick Productions - In Deep

Sponsors 
 Red Bull
 Black Crows
 Mountain Hardware
 Anon
 Squaw Valley
 Arc'teryx
 Backcountry.com
 Arcade
 Kicker

References 

Living people
1987 births
People from Olympic Valley, California